Strange New World(s) may refer to:

Uses related to Star Trek
 "strange new worlds", a phrase from the Star Trek opening narration that concludes with "where no man has gone before"
 "Strange New World" (Star Trek: Enterprise), an episode of the TV series Star Trek: Enterprise
 Star Trek: Strange New Worlds, a 2022 American television series and title of its first episode
 Star Trek: Strange New Worlds (short story collection), a science fiction anthology series of short stories

Other uses
 Strange New World (film), a 1975 television movie and pilot for a series based on concepts by Star Trek creator Gene Roddenberry
 "Strange New World" (The Batman), an episode of The Batman
 Strange New Worlds (board game), a 1978 board game

See also
 O Strange New World, a 1964 history book by Howard Mumford Jones